Nachusa is an unincorporated community in Lee County, Illinois, United States, located  east of Dixon. Nachusa has a post office with ZIP code 61057. Nachusa is located on the old C&NW main line between Chicago and Omaha.

Demographics

History
A post office called Nachusa has been in operation since 1855. The name Nachusa is said to be derived from Sac or Fox Indian.

See also
Nachusa Grasslands, a tallgrass prairie conservancy located nearby.

References

Unincorporated communities in Lee County, Illinois
Unincorporated communities in Illinois